Haradanahalli Doddegowda Deve Gowda (born 18 May 1933) is an Indian politician from the state of Karnataka. He served as the 11th prime minister of India from 1 June 1996 to 21 April 1997. He was previously the 14th Chief Minister of Karnataka from 1994 to 1996. He presently is a Member of Parliament in the Rajya Sabha representing Karnataka. He is the national president of the Janata Dal (Secular) party.Born in a farming family, he joined the Indian National Congress party in 1953, and remained a member until 1962. He was imprisoned during the Emergency. He became President of the state unit of Janata Dal in 1994, and was considered to be a driving force in the party's victory in Karnataka. He served as the 8th Chief Minister of Karnataka from 1994 to 1996.In the 1996 general elections, no party won enough seats to form a government. When the United Front, a coalition of regional parties, formed the central government with the support of the Congress, Deve Gowda was unexpectedly chosen to head the government and was elected Prime Minister. During his tenure as prime minister, he also served as Home Minister for some time. His prime ministerial tenure lasted for less than a year.After his prime ministerial tenure, he was elected to the 12th (1998), 14th (2004), 15th, and 16th Lok Sabha, as Member of Parliament for the Hassan Lok Sabha constituency. He lost Lok Sabha elections in 2019 from Tumkuru but has been elected to Rajya Sabha since.

Early life
H. D. Deve Gowda was born on 18 May 1933 in Haradanahalli, a village in Holenarasipura Taluk, of the erstwhile Kingdom of Mysore (now in Hassan, Karnataka). His father Dodde Gowda was a paddy farmer and mother, Devamma was a home maker.

Gowda earned a diploma in civil engineering from L. V. Polytechnic, Hassan, in the early 1950s.

Politics
Gowda joined the Indian National Congress party in 1953 and remained a member until 1962. During that period, he was President of Anjaneya Cooperative Society of Holenarasipura and later became a member of the Taluk Development Board of Holenarasipura.

In 1962, Gowda was elected to the Karnataka Legislative Assembly from Holenarasipura constituency as an independent candidate. Later, he was elected from the same constituency to the Assembly for six consecutive terms from 1962 to 1989. He joined the Congress (O) during the Congress split and served as the Leader of Opposition in the Assembly from March 1972 to March 1976 and again from November 1976 to December 1977. During the Emergency (1975–77), he was imprisoned in the Bangalore Central Jail.

Gowda was the two time President of state unit of the Janata Party. He continued to win from Holenarasipur assembly segment on Janata Party's ticket in 1978, 1983 and 1985.  He served as a minister in the Janata Party Government in Karnataka headed by Ramakrishna Hegde from 1983 to 1988. When V P Singh joined Janata Dal, Subramanian Swamy formed Janata Party (Jaya Prakash) faction, and Deve Gowda joined him to become Janata Party (JP)'s Karnataka President. But he lost from Holenarasipur in 1989, and soon later rejoined Janata Dal. He became President of the state unit of Janata Dal in 1994 and was the driving force behind the victory of the party in the 1994 State Assembly elections. He was elected from the Ramanagara, and sworn in as the 14th Chief Minister of Karnataka in December.

In January 1995, Gowda toured Switzerland and attended the Forum of International Economists. His tour to Singapore brought in foreign investment to the State.

Prime Minister 

In the 1996 general elections, the Congress party headed by P. V. Narasimha Rao lost decisively but no other party won enough seats to form a government.

When the United Front (a conglomeration of non-Congress and non-BJP regional parties) decided to form the Government at the Centre with the support of the Congress, Deve Gowda was unexpectedly chosen to head the government and became the 11th Prime Minister of India. He took over as Prime Minister of India on 1 June 1996 and continued until 21 April 1997. Also, he was the Chairman of the Steering Committee of the United Front, the policy making apex body of all the constituents of the ruling front. He is credited for providing financial closure and kickstarting development of the Delhi Metro Project.

Post-premiership
The Janata Dal (Secular) traces its roots back to the Janata Party (Secular) founded by Raj Narayan.

The Janata Dal was formed on the merger of the Janata Party with smaller opposition parties in 1988. Vishwanath Pratap Singh became the first Prime Minister of India from Janata Dal when he headed the National Front government in 1989. Later Deve Gowda and Inder Kumar Gujral too became prime ministers heading the United Front (UF) coalition governments in 1996 and 1997 respectively.

In 1999, when some senior leaders of the party decided to join hands with the Bharatiya Janata Party (BJP)-led NDA, the party split into factions. Many leaders, including Madhu Dandawate and Siddaramaiah, joined the Janata Dal (Secular) faction headed by Deve Gowda, who became the National president of this faction.

He was defeated in the 1999 general elections.

The 2004 elections in Karnataka witnessed the revival of his party's fortunes under the leadership of Siddaramaiah with the Janata Dal (Secular) winning 58 seats and becoming a part of the ruling coalition in the state. Later, the party joined with the BJP and formed an alternate government in 2006. His son H. D. Kumaraswamy headed the BJP-JD(S) coalition government in the state for 20 months. In the 2008 state elections, the party performed poorly and won just 28 seats, but it has remained a significant force in South Karnataka.

Deve Gowda expelled Siddaramaiah and CM Ibrahim JDS party, because Siddaramaiah led AHINDA movement; representing minority, backward, and Dalit people in Karnataka. Later, both Siddaramaiah and CM Ibrahim joined the Indian National Congress, which won the 2013 Vidhana Sabha election. Siddaramaiah was elected as the Chief Minister of Karnataka state in 2013.

In 2008, JDS did not transfer the power to BJP with B. S. Yediyurappa as CM in accord to the initial negotiation. This led to major setback for JDS in 2008 vidhana sabha election, JDS received only 28 seats compared to 58 seats in the 2004 vidhana sabha election. Since B. S. Yediyurappa is from Lingayath community, largest in the Karnataka state, many leaders in JDS from Lingayath community such as M.P. Prakash quit the party. B. S. Yediyurappa was elected as the Chief Minister of Karnataka state in 2008. Deve Gowda abused B. S. Yediyurappa, who was then chief minister of Karnataka. This event was termed as "new low in Indian politics". Gowda later apologised for hurling abuse at the chief minister of Karnataka.

Deve Gowda contested the 2019 general elections against G. S. Basavaraj in Tumkur Lok Sabha constituency of Karnataka. G. S. Basavaraj, BJP candidate of Tumkur Constituency won against Deve Gowda by a margin of 13,339 votes. G. S. Basavaraj polled 5,96,127 votes while Deve Gowda got 5,82,788 votes.

Personal life 
He married Chennamma in 1954. They have six children together: four sons, including politicians H. D. Revanna and H. D. Kumaraswamy, who is the former Chief Minister of Karnataka, and two daughters.

Electoral history

Positions held

 1962–1989, 1994–1996 : Member, Karnataka Legislative Assembly (seven terms, losing only in 1989)
 1972–1976 : Leader of Opposition, Karnataka Legislative Assembly. Elected MLA as NCO candidate from Holenarasipur.
 1978 : Janata Party Member, Karnataka Legislative Assembly, from Holenarasipur
 1983–1988 : Minister for Public Works and Irrigation, Janata Party's Government of Karnataka. MLA from Holenarasipur. 
 1989 : Karnataka State President of the new Janata Party (Jaya Prakash) faction. Subramanian Swamy was the national president. He lost assembly election in 1989 as Janata Party (Jaya Prakash) candidate from Holenarasipur 
 1990 : Left Janata Party (JP) of Subramanian Swamy, and joined Janata Dal
 1991 : Elected to 10th Lok Sabha from Hassan (Lok Sabha constituency) as Janata Dal candidate
 1991–1994 : Member, Committee on Commerce
 Member, Joint Parliamentary Committee on Fertilizers
 Member, Consultative Committee, Ministry of Agriculture
 1994 : President, Janata Dal, Karnataka.
 1994–1996 : Chief Minister of Karnataka, Janata Dal Government
 Jun. 1996 – Apr. 1997 : Prime Minister of India and also in charge of Ministries/Departments of Petroleum and Chemicals, Personnel, Public Grievances and Pensions, Atomic Energy, Home Affairs, Agriculture, Food Processing Industries, Urban Affairs and Employment and Non-Conventional Energy Sources
 1996–1998 : Member, Rajya Sabha
 Nov. 1996-Apr. 1997 : Leader of the House, Rajya Sabha
 1998 : Re-elected to 12th Lok Sabha (2nd term).
 National President, Janata Dal (Secular), which he founded in 1999. But he lost in the 13th Lok Sabha General Elections (in 1999) from Hassan to G Putta Swamy Gowda of Congress
 2002 : Entered 13th Lok Sabha winning a by-election from Kanakpura. (3rd term)
 2004 : Contested elections for 14th Lok Sabha from two seats.
 Was elected to 14th Lok Sabha (4th term), from Hassan
 But lost from Kanakpura, where he came third behind the winner Tejaswini Gowda (Congress) and Ramachandra Gowda (BJP).
 2006–2008 : Member, Committee on Railways
 2009 : Re-elected to 15th Lok Sabha (5th term)
 31 Aug 2009 : Member, Committee on Defence
 2014 : Re-elected to 16th Lok Sabha (6th term)
 1 Sep 2014 : Appointed member, Standing Committee on Defence
 23 May 2019: Lost from Tumkur in 17th Lok Sabha elections. This was the third time he lost a Lok Sabha election as a former Prime Minister, after defeats in 1999 and 2004.
 2020 : Elected to Rajya Sabha from Karnataka.

See also
 List of prime ministers of India
 List of chief ministers of Karnataka

References

External links

 
 Prime Minister H. D. Deve Gowda Prime Ministers Office, Archived

|-

1933 births
Living people
People from Hassan district
Prime Ministers of India
India MPs 2004–2009
India MPs 2009–2014
Chief Ministers of Karnataka
Gowda administration
Indian National Congress politicians
Indian National Congress (Organisation) politicians
Janata Dal (Secular) politicians
Janata Dal politicians
Janata Party politicians
Samajwadi Janata Party politicians
Kannada people
Ministers of Internal Affairs of India
Rajya Sabha members from Karnataka
India MPs 1991–1996
India MPs 1998–1999
India MPs 1999–2004
Lok Sabha members from Karnataka
Indians imprisoned during the Emergency (India)
Leaders of the Opposition in the Karnataka Legislative Assembly
Chief ministers from Janata Dal
Agriculture Ministers of India
India MPs 2014–2019
Ministers of Power of India
Mysore MLAs 1962–1967
Mysore MLAs 1967–1972
Mysore MLAs 1972–1977
Members of the Mysore Legislature
Karnataka MLAs 1978–1983
Karnataka MLAs 1983–1985
Karnataka MLAs 1985–1989